Robert Mueller Municipal Airport  (1930–1999,  "Miller") was the first civilian airport built in Austin, Texas, United States. It was replaced as Greater Austin's main airport by the Austin–Bergstrom International Airport, which is located on the site of the former Bergstrom Air Force Base. A few miles northeast of downtown Austin, the airport was named after Robert Mueller, a city commissioner who died in office in January 1927. Robert Mueller Municipal Airport was identified with the airport code AUS, which was reassigned to Austin–Bergstrom International Airport in 1999.

History 
As the need for commercial air service became clear in the 1920s, the 1928 Austin city plan called for the establishment of a municipal airport. Austin voters supported a bond election to fund the airport (among other projects) later in 1928. The airport was constructed a few miles northeast of downtown, on what was then the edge of the city. The airport began operation on 14 October 1930; airline flights began in 1936.

In the 1950s, developers began building housing beneath the flight paths of Mueller and airport traffic increased as the city grew. The April 1957 OAG lists 33 weekday departures on three airlines: fifteen on Braniff International Airways, ten on Trans-Texas Airways (TTa) and eight on Continental Airlines. Nonstop flights didn't reach beyond San Antonio, San Angelo, Dallas Love Field or Houston Hobby Airport. The first scheduled nonstop beyond Texas was a Braniff Boeing 727 to Washington Dulles Airport in 1968; that flight lasted until 1980. It was the only nonstop out of the state until Braniff tried a Chicago O'Hare Airport nonstop in 1978.

In 1963, Continental was flying Vickers Viscount turboprops Houston Hobby Airport – Austin – San Angelo – Midland/Odessa – El Paso – Tucson – Phoenix – Los Angeles and direct to Lubbock and Amarillo. By 1964, Continental had dropped Austin but by 1970 the airline had returned.

The jet age arrived in Austin in 1965 when Braniff introduced British Aircraft Corporation BAC One-Elevens nonstop to Dallas Love Field and San Antonio and direct to Chicago O'Hare, Kansas City, Oklahoma City, Wichita, Amarillo, Lubbock and Corpus Christi. In its September 7, 1965 timetable Braniff was flying Lockheed L-188 Electra propjets nonstop to Dallas Love Field, Fort Worth (via Greater Southwest International Airport) and San Antonio with direct Electras to Washington D.C. National Airport, Denver, Colorado Springs, Oklahoma City and Corpus Christi.

By 1968, Trans-Texas Airways was operating Douglas DC-9-10s to Mueller with nonstops to Dallas Love Field, Houston Hobby and San Antonio and direct to New Orleans, Memphis, Little Rock and Corpus Christi.

In early 1976, the same three airlines were at AUS (Trans-Texas Airways had changed its name to Texas International Airlines). Braniff was operating up to eight nonstops a day to Dallas/Fort Worth International Airport with Boeing 727-100s and 727-200s, the nonstop 727 to Washington Dulles Airport, and a nonstop 727-200 to San Antonio. Braniff 727s flew one-stop direct to Chicago O'Hare Airport, New York JFK Airport, Kansas City, Memphis and Amarillo and direct, multi-stop to Detroit, Newark and Washington National Airport. All of the Continental service was being operated with Boeing 727-200s, nonstop three times a day to Houston Intercontinental Airport and to Midland/Odessa, and one stop to Miami and El Paso. Continental was also operating direct, multi-stop service several times a day to Los Angeles (LAX), Phoenix and Tucson, and later flew Boeing 720Bs to Mueller on the multi-stop route between IAH and LAX. Texas International was flying nonstop Douglas DC-9-10s to Dallas/Ft. Worth International Airport, Houston Intercontinental, Lubbock and San Antonio with one-stops to Albuquerque, Amarillo, Corpus Christi, Laredo and Little Rock. Texas International also flew direct, multi-stop DC-9s to Denver and Los Angeles and nonstop Convair 600 turboprops to Houston in addition to its DC-9 service on the route. By 1979, Texas International was flying McDonnell Douglas DC-9-30s and DC-9-10s and all airline flights from Mueller were operated with mainline jets.

On February 13, 1978 Southwest Airlines, operating as an intrastate airline at this time, began Boeing 737-200 service to Mueller. In July 1978, Southwest was flying nonstop from Austin to Dallas Love Field, Houston Hobby, Corpus Christi and Harlingen. In 1979, Delta Air Lines and Eastern Air Lines began serving Austin, both airlines flying nonstop to Atlanta with Eastern also operating nonstop to Houston Intercontinental and one-stop to Boston. Delta was operating Boeing 727-200s while Eastern was flying Boeing 727-100 and McDonnell Douglas DC-9-30s to the airport. In 1981, American Airlines began service to Mueller, followed in 1983 by United Airlines and USAir (which was renamed US Airways and subsequently merged with American Airlines). American was flying nonstop to Dallas/Ft. Worth (DFW), Chicago O'Hare, and Corpus Christi during the early 1980s and was operating Boeing 727-100s and 727-200s as well as McDonnell Douglas MD-80 and wide body McDonnell Douglas DC-10 jets into the airport. American introduced Austin's first wide body service with nonstop DC-10 flights to Dallas/Ft. Worth and would later operate the Boeing 767 to DFW from Mueller as well. United was operating nonstop Boeing 727-100s to Chicago O'Hare, Denver, Dallas/Ft. Worth, and San Antonio while USAir was flying nonstop to Houston Intercontinental with one flight a day operated with a Boeing 737-200 with direct, one stop service to Pittsburgh. Other airlines operating jets to Austin during the 1980s included America West Airlines, Emerald Air (which was based in Austin and operated not only independently but also as Pan Am Express), Muse Air and its successor TranStar Airlines, Northwest Airlines, Pan Am, Trans World Airlines (TWA), and Western Airlines. By the late 1980s, every major U.S. air carrier was serving Robert Mueller Municipal Airport with mainline jets.

Expansions 
A new passenger terminal and control tower was built in 1961. The control tower was known for its alternating light blue and dark blue porcelain panels. The terminal and control tower were dedicated in a ceremony attended by Vice President Lyndon B. Johnson and Austin Mayor Lester Palmer.A major expansion at Robert Mueller Municipal Airport took place in the 1970s, including improvements to the runways and the terminal. Before the expansion, the departure area consisted of 4 to 5 gates, not enclosed but covered by a large awning, and no jetways.

For a number of years, the Texas Army National Guard had facilities at the airport.

Closure and replacement 
Whether the aging Mueller should be relocated to Manor, Texas, was a perennial issue in Austin politics, until the closure of Bergstrom Air Force Base opened another possibility.

Nearby Bergstrom Air Force Base to the southeast of downtown Austin closed as an active military base in 1993, and it was decommissioned as a reserve base in 1996. The primary runway, designed for military cargo and high-performance jets, was left intact and required little work to return to serviceable condition. Smaller military-era buildings at the site were demolished, and a new terminal building and traffic/parking infrastructure was built in their place, creating an international-capable civilian airport to replace Mueller Airport.

Robert Mueller Municipal Airport's commercial service ended on 21 May 1999, replaced by the new Austin-Bergstrom International Airport; while general aviation activities at Mueller continued through 22 June 1999.

Redevelopment as Mueller community 
The  of land that once housed the airport sat vacant and unused for more than half a decade until the city approved a development plan. The new community of Mueller broke ground in 2007 and is expected to take at least ten years to be fully developed.

The airport's control tower has been preserved and restored in response to the local community's desire to keep the iconic 1961 structure. The view of the Texas State Capitol from the base of the tower became one of the Capitol View Corridors protected under state and local law from obstruction by tall buildings in 1983, though redevelopment of the Mueller subdivision is exempt from the regulation.

Robert Mueller Municipal Airport also left behind about 20 acres and 10,000 square feet of hangar buildings that have been converted into sound stages and renamed Austin Studios. It is the home to several Austin based film and production companies such as Austin Film Society, Rooster Teeth, and Robert Rodriguez's production company, Troublemaker Studios.

Annual traffic

References

External links 

Mueller Master Developer Site
Airport diagram for April 1986

Defunct airports in Texas
Transportation in Austin, Texas
1999 disestablishments in Texas
1930 establishments in Texas
Airports established in 1930
Airports disestablished in 1999
Airports in Greater Austin